Kikuno (written: 菊野) is a Japanese surname. Notable people with the surname include:

, Japanese mixed martial artist
, Japanese watchmaker

Japanese-language surnames